District 65 is a district of the Texas House of Representatives that serves a portion of Denton County. 

The current representative is Kronda Thimesch, who was elected in 2022. Democrat Beckley could not run for re-election in 2022, as 2021 redistricting resulted in her being drawn outside of the district's new boundaries.

District description
The district is located wholly within Denton County, representing southern portions of the county.  The district includes northeastern parts of Lewisville, north half of Carrollton, all of Bartonville, Northlake, Justin, and Double Oak. As well as portions of Plano, and a very small part of Dallas that extends into Denton County.

History of district
From 1920 to 1951, District 65 was a floterial district covering Burleson, Lee and Milam counties.

From 2012 to 2032, the district represents portions of southern Denton County, namely parts of Lewisville and Carrollton.

Representatives

References

External links

065
Denton County, Texas